The disk diffusion test (also known as the agar diffusion test, Kirby–Bauer test, disc-diffusion antibiotic susceptibility test, disc-diffusion antibiotic sensitivity test and KB test) is a culture-based microbiology assay used in diagnostic and drug discovery laboratories.  In diagnostic labs, the assay is used to determine the susceptibility of bacteria isolated from a patient's infection to clinically approved antibiotics.  This allows physicians to prescribe the most appropriate antibiotic treatment.  In drug discovery labs, especially bioprospecting labs, the assay is used to screen biological material (e.g. plant extracts, bacterial fermentation broths) and drug candidates for antibacterial activity.  When bioprospecting, the assay can be performed with paired strains of bacteria to achieve dereplication and provisionally identify antibacterial mechanism of action.

In diagnostic laboratories, the test is performed by inoculating the surface of an agar plate with bacteria isolated from a patient's infection.  Antibiotic-containing paper disks are then applied to the agar and the plate is incubated.  If an antibiotic stops the bacteria from growing or kills the bacteria, there will be an area around the disk where the bacteria have not grown enough to be visible.  This is called a zone of inhibition.  The susceptibility of the bacterial isolate to each antibiotic can then be semi-quantified by comparing the size of these zones of inhibition to databases of information on known antibiotic-susceptible, moderately susceptible and resistant bacteria.  In this way, it is possible to identify the most appropriate antibiotic for treating a patient's infection.  Although the disk diffusion test cannot be used to differentiate bacteriostatic and bactericidal activity, it is less cumbersome than other susceptibility test methods such as broth dilution.

In drug discovery labs, the disk diffusion test is performed slightly differently than in diagnostic labs.  In this setting, it is not the bacterial strain that must be characterized, but a test extract (e.g. a plant or microbial extract).  The agar plate is therefore inoculated with a bacterial strain of known phenotype (often an ATCC or NCTC strain), and disks containing the test extract are applied to the surface.  Zone of inhibition sizes cannot be used as a semi-quantitative measure of antibacterial potency because different extracts contain molecules with different diffusion characteristics (different molecular sizes, hydrophilicities etc.). Zone of inhibition sizes can be used for the purpose of dereplication though.  This is achieved by testing each extract against paired strains of bacteria (e.g. streptomycin-susceptible and -resistant strains to identify streptomycin-containing extracts).  Paired strains (e.g. wild type and target overexpressing strains) can also be used to identify antibacterial mechanism of action.

History
Agar diffusion was first used by Martinus Beijerinck in 1889 to study the effect of auxins on bacterial growth.  However, the method has been developed, refined and standardized by many scientists and scientific organizations over the years including George F. Reddish, Norman Heatley, James G. Vincent, Alfred W. Bauer, William M.M. Kirby, John C. Sherris, Hans Martin Ericsson, the World Health Organization, the Clinical and Laboratory Standards Institute, the Swedish Reference Group for Antibiotics, the Deutsches Institut für Normung, the British Society for Antimicrobial Chemotherapy and others.

Principle
A pure bacterial culture is suspended in saline, its turbidity is standardized, and it is swabbed uniformly across an agar plate.  An antibiotic- or extract-impregnated filter paper disk is then placed on the surface of the agar.  The disk constituent(s) diffuse from the filter paper into the agar.  The concentration of these constituents will be highest next to the disk and will decrease as the distance from the disk increases.  If the antibiotic or extract is effective against bacteria at a certain concentration, no colonies will grow where the concentration in the agar is greater than or equal to the effective concentration.  This is the zone of inhibition.  In general, larger zones of inhibition correlate with lower minimum inhibitory concentrations (MICs) of antibiotic or extract for that bacterial strain.  An exception to this is when molecules of the antibiotic or extract are large or hydrophobic because these diffuse through the agar slowly.

Standard method

Agar plate and inoculum preparation
All aspects of the Kirby–Bauer procedure are standardized to ensure consistent and accurate results.  Because of this, a laboratory must adhere to these standards.  The media used in Kirby–Bauer testing must be Mueller–Hinton agar at only 4 mm deep, poured into either 100 mm or 150 mm Petri dishes.  The pH level of the agar must be between 7.2 and 7.4.  Bacterial inoculum is prepared by diluting a broth culture to match a 0.5 McFarland turbidity standard, which is equivalent to approximately 150 million cells per mL.

Inoculation and incubation
Using aseptic technique, broth culture of a specific organism is collected with a sterile swab.  In the case of Gram negative bacteria, excess liquid is removed from the swab by gently pressing or rotating it against the inside of the tube.  The swab is then streaked across a Mueller–Hinton agar plate to form a bacterial lawn.  To obtain uniform growth, the agar plate is streaked with the swab in one direction, rotated 120° and streaked again, rotated another 120° and streaked again.  Using an antibiotic disk dispenser, disks containing specific antibiotics are then applied to the plate.  This must be done within 15 minutes of inoculation.  Flame-sterilized forceps are used to gently press each disk onto the agar and ensure it is attached.  Plates are then incubated overnight, usually at a temperature of 35 °C.  Plates must be incubated within 15 minutes of applying antibiotic disks.

Alternate methods
Several variations of the disk diffusion method have been developed including the Oxford penicillin cup and Etest methods used in hospital diagnostic laboratories, and the well diffusion, cylinder diffusion and bioautography methods used in drug discovery and development laboratories.

Oxford penicillin cup method
Disks containing increasing antibiotic concentrations are placed on a seeded bacterial lawn on the agar surface and plates are incubated.  Zone sizes are measured from the edge of the disk to the end of the clear zone.  Interpretation is more complicated in mixed susceptibility populations.  These are plotted as linear dimensions or squares of distances as a function of the natural logarithm of antibiotic concentration in the disks.  The MIC is determined from the zero intercept of a linear regression fit through the data.  The intercept itself is the logarithm of the MIC.  The slope of the regression line is related to the diffusion coefficient of that particular antibiotic in the agar.

Other images

See also
Antibiotic sensitivity testing
Double-disk diffusion test
Etest

References

Microbiology techniques